Batticaloa Teaching Hospital is a government hospital in Batticaloa, Sri Lanka. It is the leading hospital in the Eastern Province and is controlled by the central government in Colombo. The hospital is the only teaching hospital in the Eastern Province.  The hospital is the main clinical teaching facility for the faculty of health care sciences of Eastern University. As of 2010 it had 900 beds.

References

Hospital
Central government hospitals in Sri Lanka
Hospitals in Batticaloa District
Teaching hospitals in Sri Lanka